Guriani, or Gudiyani, also known as Adarsh Gram Guriani, is a village located in Rewari district of the Haryana, India. It is located 21 km north of the district headquarters, Rewari, 309 km from state capital Chandigarh and 80 km from the capital, New Delhi.

About 1150 houses and 6000 people are living in the village. Panchayati Raj applied in this village. The village divided into four mohalla's and 16 wards. Three government schools and four private schools are running in this village.

There are three main temples, one Gurudwara, one Mosque and one Idgah and a public library in the village. There is a holiest place "Baba Miyan Munna". It is one of the holiest place of worship in Guriani where Muslim and Hindu come together. The name Baba Miyan Munna itself shows secularism of village. Miyan is for a Muslim priest and Munna for Hindu.

In the past, this village was famous for Garden of Berries (Ber ke Bag), Merchants, Horses and water. One quote is very famous about Guriani "Char Cheez tauafa-ae-Guriani, Ber, Saudagar, Ghore (Horses) aur Panni".

Guriani is the birthplace of great Poet and Freedom fighter Babu Bal Mukund Gupt and famous cartoonist and poet Ramesh Kumar Chhawal. Hindi and Haryanvi are the major languages spoken in this region.

Nearby villages 
 Kosli
 Jatusana
 Nangal Pathani
 Katopuri Bujurg
 Gugodh
 Murlipur
 Jakhala

References

Villages in Rewari district